The following page lists biggest power stations in Lithuania.

See also 
 List of power stations in Europe 
 List of largest power stations in the world

References 

 
Lithuania
Power stations